The Chinese Ambassador to Somalia is the official representative of the People's Republic of China to the Federal Republic of Somalia.

List of representatives

See also
China–Somalia relations

References 

 
Somalia
China